What a Night! is a 1928 American silent romantic comedy film directed by A. Edward Sutherland. The romantic comedy was written by Louise Long, from a story by Lloyd Corrigan and Grover Jones. The film stars Bebe Daniels, Neil Hamilton, and William Austin.

Plot
Daniels, in her final silent film, plays Dorothy Winston, an heiress who sets out to become a newspaper reporter. When she breaks a big story, she finds herself in peril.

Cast
Bebe Daniels as Dorothy Winston
Neil Hamilton as Joe Madison
William Austin as Percy Penfield
Wheeler Oakman as Mike Corney
Charles Sellon as Editor Madison
Charles Hill Mailes as Patterson
Ernie Adams as Snarky

Preservation status
This is one of Bebe Daniels's one of many lost Paramount films.

References

External links

conventional Lobby poster
Still at silenthollywood.com

American romantic comedy films
American silent feature films
American black-and-white films
1928 romantic comedy films
Lost American films
1928 lost films
Lost comedy films
1920s American films
Silent romantic comedy films
Silent American comedy films
1920s English-language films